Maurizio Peluso (born 20 June 1985) is an Italian professional footballer who plays as a forward for Foligno Calcio.

Career

Early career
Born in Taranto, Italy, Peluso spent the majority of his career alternating between Lega Pro and Serie D. He played for numerous clubs throughout Italy before signing with Serie D club Altovicentino. During his two-season stint with the club Peluso scored 31 goals in 59 matches.

Chennaiyin
After spending his entire career in Italy's lower leagues, Peluso signed with Chennaiyin of the Indian Super League on 6 August 2016.

References

External links 
 
 
 

1985 births
Living people
Sportspeople from Taranto
Italian footballers
Pisa S.C. players
U.S. Poggibonsi players
S.S. Juve Stabia players
U.S. Gavorrano players
U.S. Avellino 1912 players
Casale F.B.C. players
U.S. Pistoiese 1921 players
Chennaiyin FC players
Association football forwards
Serie C players
Serie D players
Expatriate footballers in India
Italian expatriates in India
S.F. Aversa Normanna players